Donald L. Allegrucci (September 19, 1936 – November 8, 2014) was an American politician and jurist.

Born in Pittsburg, Kansas, Allegrucci served in the United States Air Force Reserve. He received in bachelor's degree from Pittsburg State University and his law degree from Washburn Law School. Allegrucci served as assistant district attorney for Butler County, Kansas. From 1976 to 1980, Allegrucci served in the Kansas State Senator as a Democrat. In 1978, Allegrucci ran for the United States House of Representatives. From 1982 to 1986, Allegrucci served as Kansas District Court judge. Allegrucci served on the Kansas Supreme Court from 1986 until 2007. He died of cancer in Topeka, Kansas.

He also played minor league baseball for a couple seasons.

Notes

1936 births
2014 deaths
People from Pittsburg, Kansas
Washburn University alumni
Pittsburg State University alumni
Kansas state court judges
Justices of the Kansas Supreme Court
Democratic Party Kansas state senators
20th-century American judges
21st-century American judges
20th-century American politicians